The Thirteenth Guest is a 1932 American pre-Code mystery comedy thriller film, released on August 9, 1932. The film is also known as Lady Beware in the United Kingdom. It is based on the 1929 novel The Thirteenth Guest written by crime fiction author Armitage Trail, best known for the novel Scarface on which the 1932 movie of the same name was based. The novel was filmed again in 1943 as Mystery of the 13th Guest.

Plot summary

Marie Morgan (Ginger Rogers) has been lured to an old abandoned house by a false note from a friend, and is in jeopardy although she doesn't yet realize it. As she sits at the table inside, she thinks back to the banquet held there 13 years earlier, when she was a little girl. Only 12 of 13 guests had attended, and the manor's owner, the Morgan family patriarch, who was then dying, has since passed on. The chance to claim the bulk of the estate fortune has resulted in an ongoing campaign of murder by someone targeting the original 12 guests, whose dead bodies are being left at the table in the same seats they had occupied originally.

Cast
Ginger Rogers as Lela/Marie Morgan 
Lyle Talbot as Phil Winston 
J. Farrell MacDonald as Police Capt. Ryan 
Paul Hurst as Detective Grump 
Erville Alderson as Uncle John Adams 
Ethel Wales as Aunt Jane Thornton 
James Eagles as Harold 'Bud' Morgan 
Crauford Kent as Dr. Sherwood 
Eddie Phillips as Thor Jensen 
Frances Rich as Marjorie Thornton 
Phillips Smalley as Uncle Dick Thornton
Allan Cavan as Uncle Wayne Seymour (uncredited)
William Davidson as Police Capt. Brown (uncredited) 
John Ince as Uncle John Morgan (uncredited) 
Tom London as Detective Carter (uncredited) 
Harry Tenbrook as Cabby (uncredited)
Adrienne Dore as Winston's Date (uncredited)

See also
 List of films in the public domain in the United States

References

External links

 
 
 

American mystery films
American comedy thriller films
1932 films
American black-and-white films
Monogram Pictures films
Films based on American novels
1932 comedy films
1930s mystery films
1930s English-language films
1930s American films